In enzymology, a gluconate 2-dehydrogenase (acceptor) is an enzyme that catalyzes the chemical reaction

D-gluconate + acceptor  2-dehydro-D-gluconate + reduced acceptor

Thus, the two substrates of this enzyme are D-gluconate and acceptor, whereas its two products are 2-dehydro-D-gluconate and reduced acceptor.

This enzyme belongs to the family of oxidoreductases, specifically those acting on the CH-OH group of donor with other acceptors.  The systematic name of this enzyme class is D-gluconate:acceptor 2-oxidoreductase. Other names in common use include gluconate oxidase, gluconate dehydrogenase, gluconic dehydrogenase, D-gluconate dehydrogenase, gluconic acid dehydrogenase, 2-ketogluconate reductase, D-gluconate dehydrogenase, 2-keto-D-gluconate-yielding, and D-gluconate:(acceptor) 2-oxidoreductase.  This enzyme participates in pentose phosphate pathway.  It employs one cofactor, FAD.

References

 
 

EC 1.1.99
Flavoproteins
Enzymes of unknown structure